Fenwood Road station is a light rail stop on the MBTA Green Line E branch, located on Huntington Avenue at Fenwood Road in the Mission Hill neighborhood of Boston, Massachusetts. Fenwood Road is the third-least-used stop on the Green Line (after  and ), with 221 daily boardings by a 2011 count.

The station is located on a street running segment of the E branch; trains run in mixed traffic rather than a dedicated median. The station has no platforms; riders wait on the sidewalks (shared with bus stops for the route 39 and 66 buses) and cross the street to reach trains. Because of this, the station is not accessible.

In 2021, the MBTA indicated plans to modify the Heath Street–Brigham Circle section of the E branch with accessible platforms to replace the existing non-accessible stopping locations.

References

External links

MBTA - Fenwood Road
Station from Google Maps Street View

Green Line (MBTA) stations
Railway stations in Boston